Byron Atkins "Barney" Slaughter (October 6, 1884 in Smyrna, Delaware – May 17, 1961 in Philadelphia, Pennsylvania) was a pitcher in Major League Baseball. He pitched 8 games for the Philadelphia Phillies in 1910. He recorded one loss and one save in his career, mostly as a relief pitcher. He also started one game. In 1911 Slaughter pitched for Scranton in the New York State League, and subsequently for Louisville in the American Association, Sioux City in the Western League, and Erie in the Central League, before retiring from organized baseball in 1913.

After leaving baseball, he was employed by the Pennsylvania Railroad Company, working in the secretary's office for more than 35 years before retiring at the age of 65.

On May 17, 1961, Barney Slaughter died in Philadelphia, at the age of 76 and was interred at Glenwood Memorial Gardens in Broomall, Pennsylvania.

References

External links
Baseball Reference.com page
Phillies 1910 Home Uniform
Phillies 1910 Home and Away Uniforms

1884 births
1961 deaths
Burials at Glenwood Cemetery/Glenwood Memorial Gardens
Philadelphia Phillies players
Major League Baseball pitchers
Baseball players from Delaware
Washington (minor league baseball) players
Scranton Miners players
Erie Sailors players